Howard Township is one of thirteen townships in Parke County, Indiana, United States. As of the 2010 census, its population was 341 and it contained 157 housing units.  The township includes the western end of Shades State Park and the southeast quarter of Turkey Run State Park.

History
Howard Township was established about 1855, and named for General Howard, an early settler.

Geography

Unincorporated towns
 Banner Mills at 
 Byron at 
(This list is based on USGS data and may include former settlements.)

Cemeteries
.The township contains Lough Cemetery and Wolf Creek Cemetery.

Major highways
  Indiana State Road 47

School districts
 Turkey Run Community School Corporation

Political districts
 State House District 41
 State Senate District 38

References
 
 United States Census Bureau 2009 TIGER/Line Shapefiles
 IndianaMap

External links
 Indiana Township Association
 United Township Association of Indiana
 City-Data.com page for Howard Township

Townships in Parke County, Indiana
Townships in Indiana